James Taylor-Watts (born 27 October 1997), better known as James TW, is an English singer-songwriter. His single "When You Love Someone" peaked at number 28 on the Billboard Adult Pop Songs chart.

Early life
Taylor-Watts was born in England, the son of Sarah and Richard Taylor-Watts. He was named after James Taylor, one of his parents' favourite musicians.

Taylor-Watts' father, who played guitar in a wedding band as a hobby, once found a young James playing on the drum kit at home. Shortly thereafter, the band's drummer wasn't able to make it to a gig. So the band had a decision to make: either let 10 year-old Taylor-Watts play or cancel the gig. Taylor-Watts played that evening and has been performing on a regular basis ever since. He picked up guitar at 12 years old and started playing piano the following year. In 2010, Taylor-Watts started his YouTube channel at 12 years old.

Career

2014–2016: Just a Number and First Impressions
In 2014, Taylor-Watts self-released the EP Just a Number, which rose to number 6 on the iTunes Singer/Songwriter chart. In early 2015, Shawn Mendes, an artist discovered on social media, found Taylor-Watts on YouTube and praised him on Twitter. Mendes' label, Island Records, then noticed Taylor-Watts and he signed with them shortly thereafter. On 30 October 2015, Taylor-Watts released his debut single "Black & Blue". On 19 February 2016, he released a music video for his single, "When You Love Someone", through Universal Music. The song reached over 60 million Spotify streams and peaked at No. 28 on Billboards Adult Pop Songs chart.

On 15 April 2016, Taylor-Watts released his debut EP titled First Impressions, featuring five original songs as well as a cover of "Torn" by Natalie Imbruglia, which earned 17 million Spotify streams and peaked at 15 on the Spotify Viral 50 chart. Taylor-Watts was the sole opening act on the sold out Shawn Mendes World Tour. On 9 September 2016, he released a cover of Gnarls Barkley's "Crazy".

2017–present: Chapters and Heartbeat Changes 
On 23 January 2017, Taylor-Watts performed "When You Love Someone" on The Ellen DeGeneres Show. He released the single "Ex" on 17 February 2017 while premiering the video via Billboard on the same day. In February, he was named the opening act on the European leg of Shawn Mendes' Illuminate World Tour with dates from April to June 2017.

Taylor-Watts released a new single called "You & Me" on 18 January 2019. The song, alongside "When You Love Someone", "Say Love" and "Soldier", was included on his debut album Chapters, which was released the following April.

Taylor-Watts announced in March 2021 that he would be releasing the single "Butterflies" on 19 March 2021. In September, he released the EP Heartbeat Changes (Part 1), followed by his second full-length album Heartbeat Changes on 10 June 2022. The album comprises the songs from the EP plus seven new tracks.

Discography

Albums

Extended plays

Singles

Notes

References

External links
 Official website

1997 births
Living people
English male singer-songwriters
People from Barford, Warwickshire
21st-century English male singers
Island Records artists